Vladykino may refer to:
Vladykino (Serpukhovsko-Timiryazevskaya line), a metro station
Vladykino (Moscow Central Circle), a metro station
Vladykino (rural locality), several rural localities in Russia